David Kiptarus Ruto (born 1980) is a Kenyan former long-distance runner who competed in road races. He was the team gold medallist at the 2000 IAAF World Half Marathon Championships alongside Paul Tergat and Joseph Kimani, having finished fifth individually.

Ruto competed from 2000 to 2009 and his biggest win was at the 2003 Miami Marathon. He also had runner-up finishes at the Three Hearts Marathon, Brussels Marathon and Mumbai Marathon. He ran the marathon in under two hours and ten minutes on two occasions, including 2:09:21 for third at the 2003 Eindhoven Marathon and 2:08:21 hours at the 2003 Paris Marathon.

International competitions

References

Living people
1980 births
Kenyan male long-distance runners
Kenyan male marathon runners